Bloomer is an unincorporated community in Miami County, in the U.S. state of Ohio.

History
An old variant name was Bloomertown. A post office called Bloomertown was established in 1878, the name was changed to Bloomer in 1888, and the post office closed in 1926. Besides the post office, Bloomer had a sawmill.

References

Unincorporated communities in Miami County, Ohio
Unincorporated communities in Ohio